The Guinea multimammate mouse (Mastomys erythroleucus) is a species of rodent in the family Muridae found in Benin, Burkina Faso, Burundi, Cameroon, the Central African Republic, Chad, the Republic of the Congo, the Democratic Republic of the Congo, Ivory Coast, Ethiopia, Gambia, Ghana, Guinea, Guinea-Bissau, Kenya, Liberia, Mali, Mauritania, Morocco, Niger, Nigeria, Rwanda, Senegal, Sierra Leone, Sudan, Togo, and Uganda.
Its natural habitats are subtropical or tropical dry forests, dry savanna, moist savanna, subtropical or tropical dry shrubland, subtropical or tropical moist shrubland, arable land, rural gardens, urban areas, and irrigated land. They weigh between 12 and 105 grams.

References
 Granjon, L., Lavrenchenko, L. & Agwanda, B. 2004.  Mastomys erythroleucus.   2006 IUCN Red List of Threatened Species.   Downloaded on 19 July 2007.
Musser, G. G. and M. D. Carleton. 2005. Superfamily Muroidea. pp. 894–1531 in Mammal Species of the World a Taxonomic and Geographic Reference. D. E. Wilson and D. M. Reeder eds. Johns Hopkins University Press, Baltimore.
Brambell, F. W. and Davis, D. H. (1941), Reproduction of the Multimammate Mouse (Mastomys erythroleucus Temm.) of Sierra Leone. Proceedings of the Zoological Society of London, B111: 1–11. doi:10.1111/j.1469-7998.1941.tb00038.x

Mastomys
Mouse, Guinea multimammate
Mouse, Guinea multimammate
Mammals described in 1853
Taxonomy articles created by Polbot